The tenth season of the Australian competitive cooking competition My Kitchen Rules, titled 10th Anniversary Season, premiered on the Seven Network on Monday 28 January, 2019.

Before this series aired, The Best of MKR was shown depicting MKR's journey over the years

Applications for contestants opened during the airing of the ninth season. Pete Evans and Manu Feildel returned as judges, with Colin Fassnidge acting as a judge/mentor in the challenge/elimination rounds.

Format Changes
MKR Restaurant – The previous Kitchen Headquarters has been replaced with an MKR restaurant, featuring two kitchens and a dining area. It is used for all head-to-head Sudden Death Cook-Offs and the Finals.
Perfect Strangers – Milly and Karolina are the first two people that haven't known each other before working as a team.
Pop Up Restaurants - Groups will go on separate challenge like Season 9 from Top 13 to Top 11. Each time for the challenge, teams will cook for Pete, Colin, the other group and the public. The team that has the most score from the public receive People's Choice and get advantage in the scoring of the Sudden Death, while Pete and Colin will choose the weakest team to go to Sudden Death.
Open Houses – From Top 10, two teams from each group will work together to make a three-course meal for Pete, Manu, the teams and the public. At the end of this round, the two teams that have the lowest score will compete against each other in a Sudden Death Cook-Off.
New Quarterfinal - In the first three quarterfinals, instead of cooking food just for the judges, contestants have to serve for the public, VIPs, contestants from past seasons, kids and adults in the MKR Restaurant. The team with the highest score will progress to the semi-finals.
Triple Elimination Quarterfinal - For the first time, three teams will be eliminated from the competition in the last quarterfinal.
Judges on the Grand Finale - Instead of having six judges to score the dishes, a total of ten judges will be present, including the six judges in the semifinals and Guy Turland, Shannon Martinez, Sean Connoly and Rachel Khoo.

Teams

Elimination history

Competition details

Instant Restaurants
During the Instant Restaurant rounds, each team hosts a three-course dinner for judges and fellow teams in their allocated group. They are scored and ranked among their group, with the two lowest scoring teams sent to the Sudden Death Cook-Off at the MKR restaurant, with a risk of being eliminated.

Round 1
 Episodes 1 to 8
 Airdate — 28 January to 10 February
 Description — The first of the two instant restaurant groups are introduced into the competition in Round 1. The two lowest scoring teams at the end of the round will go to the Sudden Death Cook-Off at the MKR restaurant, with a risk of being eliminated.

Sudden Death Cook-Off (Group 1)
 Episode 9
 Airdate — 11 February 
 Description — Being the two bottom scoring teams from Round 1, Josh & Austin and Karito & Ian will face off in a Sudden Death Cook-Off. The lower scoring team is eliminated. The Sudden Death Cook-Off is held in the MKR Restaurant with seven new Group 2 teams invited as the guests and jury.

Round 2
 Episodes 10 to 17
 Airdate — 12 February to 25 February
 Description — The second group now start their instant restaurant round. The same rules from the previous round apply and the two lowest scoring teams will go to the Sudden Death Cook-Off at the MKR restaurant, with a risk of being eliminated.

Sudden Death Cook-Off (Group 2)
 Episode 18
 Airdate — 26 February
 Description — Being the two lowest scoring teams from Round 2, Milly & Karolina and Veronica & Piper will face off in the second Sudden Death Cook-Off at the MKR restaurant. The lower scoring team is eliminated. The seven remaining Group 1 teams are invited as the guests and jury.

Top 14

Elimination Challenge
 Episode 19
 Airdate — 27 February
 Description — All teams headed into the first challenge in a Group 1 vs Group 2 cook-off. In the first round, both groups nominated one team to cook a good (but not perfect) dish from a previous season. The winning team saved their entire group from elimination. The losing team and their group then faced off individually in a Sudden Death Cook-Off, tasked to create a dish that received a perfect score from a previous season. The team with the worst dish judged by Pete and Colin was eliminated.

Top 13

Group 2: Diner Challenge

 Episode 20
 Airdate - 3 March
 Guest Mentor - Shannon Martinez
 Description - Teams from Group 2 cooked and served diner-style dishes at Archie Brothers Cirque Electriq. Guests and teams from Group 1 were invited to taste the food and score the dish(es) out of 10. The team that performed best (determined by scores given) would be given a scoring advantage at the Sudden Death Cook-Off. The weakest team as determined by Pete and Colin would be sent to Sudden Death and the MKR Restaurant.

Group 1: Brunch Challenge
 Episode 21
 Airdate - 4 March
 Guest Mentor - Guy Turland
 Description - Teams from Group 1 cooked and served brunch-style dishes at Bondi Surf Life Bathers Club. Guests and teams from Group 2 were invited to taste the food and score the dish(es) out of 10. The team that performed best (determined by scores given) would be given a scoring advantage at the Sudden Death Cook-Off. The weakest team as determined by Pete and Colin would be sent to Sudden Death and the MKR Restaurant.

Sudden Death Cook-Off (Group Challenge 1)
 Episode 22
 Airdate — 5 March
 Description — Anne & Jennifer and Mick & Jodie-Anne were the weakest teams in the group challenges, will face off in a Sudden Death Cook-Off at Elimination House, where one team is eliminated. All guest teams score both meals out of 10. Victor & G and Ibby & Romel, as People's Choice winners, had the advantage of having each team member score both meals, meaning their scores would be doubled. Judges Pete and Manu scored each dish out of 10. Ibby & Romel were explicit in strategic voting giving 1 for the group two and 10 for group 1.

Top 12 → Top 11

Group 1: Farmers Challenge 
 Episode 23
 Airdate — 6 March
 Guest Mentor - Curtis Stone
 Description — Teams from Group 1 were asked to make a sophisticated, fine dining dish, showcasing beautiful farm produce for Australian farmers. Guests and teams from Group 2 were invited to taste the food and score the dish(es) out of 10. The team that performed best (determined by scores given) would be given a scoring advantage at the Sudden Death Cook-Off. Despite the departure of Stacey & Ash, the weakest team would still be determined by Pete and Colin and would be sent to Sudden Death and the MKR Restaurant.

Group 2: Seafood Challenge
 Episode 24
 Airdate — 10 March
 Guest Mentor - Sean Connoly
 Description — Group 2 were asked to make fine dining seafood dishes for 100 sailors. Guests and teams from Group 1 were invited to taste the food and score the dish(es) out of 10. The team that performed best (determined by scores given) would be given a scoring advantage at the Sudden Death Cook-Off. The weakest team as determined by Pete and Colin would be sent to Sudden Death at the MKR Restaurant.

Sudden Death Cook-Off
 Episode 25
 Airdate — 11 March
 Description — Amanda & Blake and Lyn & Sal, were the weakest teams in the group challenges, and will face off in a Sudden Death Cook-Off at the MKR Restaurant, where one team will be eliminated. All guest teams score both meals out of 10. Andy & Ruby and Lisa & John, as People's Choice winners, had the advantage of having each team member score both meals, meaning their scores would be doubled. Judges Pete and Manu scored each dish out of 10.

Top 10

Open Houses
 Episodes 26 to 30
 Airdate — 12 to 19 March
 Description — For the first time ever on My Kitchen Rules, teams are paired in mystery match-ups for a supercharged Open House round, serving a three-course meal to judges, guest teams and members of the public. The bottom pair of teams will find themselves cooking against each other at the Sudden Death Cook-Off.

Sudden Death Cook-Off
 Episode 31
 Airdate — 20 March
 Description — Mick & Jodie-Anne and Lyn & Sal, were the weakest teams in the open house challenge, and will face off in a Sudden Death Cook-Off at the MKR Restaurant, where one team will be eliminated. All guest teams score both meals out of 10. Judges Pete and Manu scored each dish out of 10.

Top 9
 Episode 32
 Airdate — 24 March
 Description —  Teams all cooked together. They were asked to make a biscuit with a few other elements to make it a complete dish for hungry shoppers and the Judges. Based on the public's scores out of 10, the winning team will have their biscuit packaged and sold in Coles supermarkets around Australia. The weakest team as determined by Pete and Colin, will receive a time penalty and have a disadvantage in the next challenge.

 Episode 33
 Airdate — 25 March
 Description — Teams cooked in two rounds. They had to make a great dish featuring different types of Beer. They served the beer loving public, the other teams who weren't cooking, and the judges. The favorite dish, chosen by the beer lovers, will get beer lovers choice and not have to cook in the next challenge. Pete and Colin will choose the worst dish who will go through to the next sudden death cook off at the MKR Restaurant.

 Episode 34
 Airdate — 26 March
 Description — Teams were split up over 3 locations, The Sydney Cricket Ground, a Fire Station and a Construction Site. They were asked to make a delicious meal for their specific diners and judges. The team with the highest score from their diners will be named People's Choice.  The weakest team, chosen by Pete & Colin, will be sent to the Elimination Cook-Off against Victor & G.

Sudden Death Cook-Off
 Episode 35
 Airdate – 27 March
 Description – Victor & G and Lyn & Sal were the two weakest teams from the previous challenges. They will go against each other in a 3 course cook-off. As People's Choice winners, Ibby & Romel and Matt & Luke will get a scoring advantage and will both score each 3 course meal out of 10, giving them a total score out of 20. The other teams will score as a team out of 10. Pete & Manu will score each dish out of 10. The team with the lowest total score will be eliminated.

Top 8

Ultimate Instant Restaurants
 Episodes - 36 to 43
 Air date — 31 March to 10 April
 Description — The 8 remaining teams are once again travelling around the country for the Ultimate Instant Restaurant round. It's opened by Matt and Luke and Closed by Andy and Ruby. Teams will cook 2 Entrées, 2 Mains, and 2 Desserts. Following success last year the clock returns for each course with 90 minutes for both Entrée and Main and 1 hour for Dessert. The team with the lowest score will be eliminated.
 Colour Key:
  – Judge's Score for Option 1
  – Judge's Score for Option 2

 Note
 – Individual guest scores were not revealed.

Top 7 - Quarterfinals
The Top 7 teams meet at Kitchen Headquarters to compete in four Quarter Final challenges to determine the teams entering the Semi-Final round. One team advances after each night until the Top 4 semi-finalists are decided and the remaining three teams will be eliminated.

Quarterfinals 1
Episode 44
Air date - 14 April
Description  — This is the first quarterfinal of this season. Seven teams have to cook for Pete, Colin and 100 public customers. Also, Manu will be in charge of the kitchen and tell the orders to the contestants. Scores from judges Pete, Colin and the public customers will determine the winning team who will go straight to the Semi-Finals.

Quarterfinals 2
Episode 45
Air date - 15 April
Description — This is the second quarterfinal of this season. Six teams have to cook for Pete, Manu & Colin and 100 VIP customers including celebrities at the MKR restaurant. Scores from judges Pete, Manu, Colin and the VIPs will determine the winning team.

Quarterfinals 3
Episode 46
Air date - 16 April
Description — This is the third quarterfinal of this season. Five teams have to cook for Pete, Manu & Colin and contestants from the past seasons at the MKR restaurant. Scores from judges Pete, Manu and the past contestants will determine the winning team who will join Ibby & Romel, Matt & Luke in the Semi-Finals.

Quarterfinals 4
Episode 47
Air date - 21 April

Round 1
Description — This is the fourth and final quarterfinal of this season. Four teams have to cook for 100 kids at the MKR restaurant. Scores from judges Pete and Manu, will determine the three teams into Round 2 while one team is eliminated.

Round 2 - Top 6
Description — The three teams who advanced from Round 1 will have to cook for 100 adults, Pete and Manu.  Scores from judges Pete, Manu and the adults will determine the winning team who will join Ibby & Romel, Luke & Matt and Pat & Bianca in the Semi Finals.

Semi-finals

Semi-final 1
 Episode 48
 Airdate —  22 April
 Description — Ibby & Romel compete against Pat & Bianca.

Semi-final 2
 Episode 49
 Airdate —  23 April
 Description — Matt & Luke compete against Andy & Ruby.

Grand Finale
 Episode 50
 Airdate — 28 April
 Description — Each finalist cooked a five-course meal, with over 20 plates per course for the eliminated teams, friends and family.  In a series first, the guest judges, Pete and Manu, were joined by four special guests judges who appeared in challenge episodes throughout the series, meaning there were 10 judges total this year. They each scored the five course meals out of 10 for the final verdict.

Ratings
 Colour Key:
  – Highest Rating
  – Lowest Rating
  – Elimination Episode
  – Finals Week

Notes

References

External links 
 
My Kitchen Rules on 7plus

2019 Australian television seasons
My Kitchen Rules